Josef Dande (1911–1969) was a Hungarian artist born in 1911 in Belényes, Hungary.  Dande studied at the Budapest Academy of Fine Arts.  He is well known for idyllic winter landscapes.

Hungarian painters
Realist painters
1911 births
Year of death missing
People from Beiuș
Hungarian University of Fine Arts alumni